Mesatirhinus is a genus of brontothere endemic to North America during the Eocene living from 50.3 to 42 mya, existing for approximately .

Taxonomy
Mesatirhinus was named by Osborn (1908). It is not extant. It was assigned to Brontotheriidae by Osborn (1908) and Carroll (1988); and to Dolichorhininae by Mader (1998).

Morphology
This animal's height is said to be approximately 1 m (3 feet).

References

Brontotheres
Eocene odd-toed ungulates
Lutetian extinctions
Eocene mammals of Asia
Fossil taxa described in 1908